Nils Jønsberg (12 August 1808 – 28 April 1885) was a Norwegian priest and politician.

Biography
Nils Simensen Jønsberg was born on the Jønsberg farm in Romedal parish in Hedmark, Norway.  He was the son of parish priest  (sogneprest) Simen Christoffersen Jønsberg and Karen Dorthea Thesen Arneberg. He graduated at the Cathedral School in Christiania, (now Oslo) in 1827. He earned his theological degree in 1831. He started his career as a chaplain in Drøbak in the municipality of Frogn in Akershus. He graduated as cand.theol. in 1831. In 1835 he was appointed as parish priest in Karlsøy in Troms county,  where he also served as the first mayor (1838-1841).

He was an elected to the Norwegian Parliament in 1842, representing the constituency of Finmarkens Amt, which at that time consisted of both Finnmark and Troms. He sat through only one term. Later he was parish priest in Skjerstad  in Nordland (1843-1855), where he was the mayor (1844-1848) and (1852-1856). He was appointed vicar in Skogn in Nord-Trøndelag (1855-1868) and at Arendal in Aust-Agder (1868-1881).

His grandson Nils Erik Flakstad served as a member of Parliament representing the market towns of Hedmark and Oppland counties.

References

1808 births
1885 deaths
People from Stange
People educated at Oslo Cathedral School
Norwegian priest-politicians
Members of the Storting
Finnmark politicians